The economic and monetary union (EMU) of the European Union is a group of policies aimed at converging the economies of member states of the European Union at three stages. 

There are three stages of the EMU, each of which consists of progressively closer economic integration. Only once a state participates in the third stage it is permitted to adopt the euro as its official currency. As such, the third stage is largely synonymous with the eurozone.  The euro convergence criteria are the set of requirements that needs to be fulfilled in order for a country to be approved to participate in the third stage. An important element of this is participation for a minimum of two years in the European Exchange Rate Mechanism ("ERM II"), in which candidate currencies demonstrate economic convergence by maintaining limited deviation from their target rate against the euro. 

The EMU policies cover all European Union member states.  All new EU member states must commit to participate in the third stage in their treaties of accession and are obliged to enter the third stage once they comply with all convergence criteria. Twenty EU member states, including most recently Croatia, have entered the third stage and have adopted the euro as their currency. Denmark, whose EU membership predates the introduction of the euro, has a legal opt-out from the EU Treaties and is thus not required to enter the third stage.

History

Early developments
The idea of an economic and monetary union in Europe was first raised well before establishing the European Communities.  For example, the Latin Monetary Union existed from 1865 to 1927. In the League of Nations, Gustav Stresemann asked in 1929 for a European currency against the background of an increased economic division due to a number of new nation states in Europe after World War I.

In 1957 at the European Forum Alpbach, De Nederlandsche Bank Governor  argued that a common central-bank policy was necessary in a unified Europe, but his subsequent advocacy of a coordinated initiative by the European Community's central banks was met with skepticism from the heads of the National Bank of Belgium, Bank of France and Deutsche Bundesbank.

A first concrete attempt to create an economic and monetary union between the members of the European Communities goes back to an initiative by the European Commission in 1969, which set out the need for "greater co-ordination of economic policies and monetary cooperation," which was followed by the decision of the Heads of State or Government at their summit meeting in The Hague in 1969 to draw up a plan by stages with a view to creating an economic and monetary union by the end of the 1970s.

On the basis of various previous proposals, an expert group chaired by Luxembourg's Prime Minister and Finance Minister, Pierre Werner, presented in October 1970 the first commonly agreed blueprint to create an economic and monetary union in three stages (Werner plan). The project experienced serious setbacks from the crises arising from the non-convertibility of the US dollar into gold in August 1971 (i.e., the collapse of the Bretton Woods System) and from rising oil prices in 1972.  An attempt to limit the fluctuations of European currencies, using a snake in the tunnel, failed.

Delors Report

The debate on EMU was fully re-launched at the Hannover Summit in June 1988, when an ad hoc committee (Delors Committee) of the central bank governors of the twelve member states, chaired by the President of the European Commission, Jacques Delors, was asked to propose a new timetable with clear, practical and realistic steps for creating an economic and monetary union. This way of working was derived from the Spaak method.

The Delors report of 1989 set out a plan to introduce the EMU in three stages and it included the creation of institutions like the European System of Central Banks (ESCB), which would become responsible for formulating and implementing monetary policy.

The three stages for the implementation of the EMU were the following:

Stage One: 1 July 1990 to 31 December 1993
On 1 July 1990, exchange controls are abolished, thus capital movements are completely liberalised in the European Economic Community.
The Treaty of Maastricht in 1992 establishes the completion of the EMU as a formal objective and sets a number of economic convergence criteria, concerning the inflation rate, public finances, interest rates and exchange rate stability.
The treaty enters into force on 1 November 1993.

Stage Two: 1 January 1994 to 31 December 1998
The European Monetary Institute is established as the forerunner of the European Central Bank, with the task of strengthening monetary cooperation between the member states and their national banks, as well as supervising ECU banknotes.
On 16 December 1995, details such as the name of the new currency (the euro) as well as the duration of the transition periods are decided.
On 16–17 June 1997, the European Council decides at Amsterdam to adopt the Stability and Growth Pact, designed to ensure budgetary discipline after creation of the euro, and a new exchange rate mechanism (ERM II) is set up to provide stability above the euro and the national currencies of countries that haven't yet entered the eurozone.
On 3 May 1998, at the European Council in Brussels, the 11 initial countries that will participate in the third stage from 1 January 1999 are selected.
On 1 June 1998, the European Central Bank (ECB) is created, and on 31 December 1998, the conversion rates between the 11 participating national currencies and the euro are established.

Stage Three: 1 January 1999 and continuing
From the start of 1999, the euro is now a real currency, and a single monetary policy is introduced under the authority of the ECB. A three-year transition period begins before the introduction of actual euro notes and coins, but legally the national currencies have already ceased to exist.
On 1 January 2001, Greece joins the third stage of the EMU.
On 1 January 2002, the euro notes and coins are introduced.
On 1 January 2007, Slovenia joins the third stage of the EMU.
On 1 January 2008, Cyprus and Malta join the third stage of the EMU.
On 1 January 2009, Slovakia joins the third stage of the EMU.
On 1 January 2011, Estonia joins the third stage of the EMU.
On 1 January 2014, Latvia joins the third stage of the EMU.
On 1 January 2015, Lithuania joins the third stage of the EMU.
On 1 January 2023, Croatia joins the third stage of the EMU.

Criticism
There have been debates as to whether the Eurozone countries constitute an optimum currency area.

There has also been significant doubt if all eurozone states really fulfilled a "high degree of sustainable convergence" as demanded by the Maastricht treaty as condition to join the Euro without getting into financial trouble later on.

Monetary policy inflexibility

Since membership of the eurozone establishes a single monetary policy and essentially use of a 'foreign currency' for the respective states, they can no longer use an isolated national monetary policy as an economic tool within their central banks. Nor can they issue money to finance any required government deficits or pay interest on government bond sales. All this is effected centrally from the ECB. As a consequence, if member states do not manage their economy in a way that they can show a fiscal discipline (as they were obliged by the Maastricht treaty), the mechanism means a member state could effectively 'run out of money' to finance spending. This is characterized as a sovereign debt crisis where a country is without the possibility of refinancing itself with a sovereign currency. This is what happened to Greece, Ireland, Portugal, Cyprus, and Spain.

Plans for reformed Economic and Monetary Union
Being of the opinion that the pure austerity course was not able to solve the Euro-crisis, French President François Hollande reopened the debate about a reform of the architecture of the Eurozone. The intensification of work on plans to complete the existing EMU in order to correct its economic errors and social upheavals soon introduced the keyword "genuine" EMU. At the beginning of 2012, a proposed correction of the defective Maastricht currency architecture comprising: introduction of a fiscal capacity of the EU, common debt management and a completely integrated banking union, appeared unlikely to happen. Additionally, there were widespread fears that a process of strengthening the Union's power to intervene in eurozone member states and to impose flexible labour markets and flexible wages, might constitute a serious threat to Social Europe. In the negotiation process, member states advocated different solutions depending on their political and political characteristics, while the result was a broad compromise.

First EMU reform plan (2012–15)
In December 2012, at the height of the European sovereign debt crisis, which revealed a number of weaknesses in the architecture of the EMU, a report entitled "Towards a genuine Economic and Monetary Union" was issued by the four presidents of the Council, European Commission, ECB and Eurogroup. The report outlined the following roadmap for implementing actions being required to ensure the stability and integrity of the EMU:

Second EMU reform plan (2015–25): The Five Presidents' Report 
In June 2015, a follow-up report entitled "Completing Europe's Economic and Monetary Union" (often referred to as the "Five Presidents Report") was issued by the presidents of the Council, European Commission, ECB, Eurogroup and European Parliament. The report outlined a roadmap for further deepening of the EMU, meant to ensure a smooth functioning of the currency union and to allow the member states to be better prepared for adjusting to global challenges:

 Stage 1 (July 2015 – June 2017): The EMU should be made more resilient by building on existing instruments and making the best possible use of the existing Treaties. In other words, "deepening by doing". This first stage comprise implementation of the following eleven working points.
 Deepening the Economic Union by ensuring a new boost to convergence, jobs and growth across the entire eurozone. This shall be achieved by:
 Creation of a eurozone system of Competitiveness Authorities: 
 Strengthened implementation of the Macroeconomic Imbalance Procedure: 
 Greater focus on employment and social performance in the European Semester: 
 Stronger coordination of economic policies within a revamped European Semester:
 Completing and fully exploiting the Single Market by creating an Energy Union and Digital Market Union.
 Complete construction of the Banking union of the European Union. This shall be achieved by:
 Setting up a bridge financing mechanism for the Single Resolution Fund (SRF): 
 Implementing concrete steps towards the common backstop to the SRF: 
 Agreeing on a common European Deposit Insurance Scheme (EDIS):
 Improving the effectiveness of the instrument for direct bank recapitalisation in the European Stability Mechanism: 
 Launch a new Capital Markets Union (CMU):
The European Commission has published a green paper describing how they envisage to build a new Capital Markets Union (CMU), and will publish a more concrete action plan for how to achieve it in September 2015. The CMU is envisaged to include all 28 EU Members and to be fully build by 2019. Its construction will:
 (A) Improve access to financing for all businesses across Europe and investment projects, in particular start-ups, SMEs and long-term projects.
 (B) Increase and diversify the sources of funding from investors in the EU and all over the world, so that companies (including SMEs) in addition to the already available bank credit lending also can tap capital markets through alternative funding sources that better suits them.
 (C) Make the capital markets work more effectively by connecting investors and those who need funding more efficiently, both within Member States and cross-border.
 (D) Make the capital markets more shock resilient by pooling cross-border private risk-sharing through a deepening integration of bond and equity markets, hereby also protecting it better against the risk for systemic shocks in the national financial sector.
 The establishment of the CMU, is envisaged at the same time to require a strengthening of the available tools to manage systemic risks of financial players prudently (macro-prudential toolkit), and a strengthening of the supervisory framework for financial actors to ensure their solidity and that they have sufficient risk management structures in place (ultimately leading to the launch of a new single European capital markets supervisor). A harmonized taxation scheme for capital market activities, could also play an important role in terms of providing a neutral treatment for different but comparable activities and investments across jurisdictions. A genuine CMU is envisaged also to require update of EU legislation in the following four areas: (A) Simplification of prospectus requirements; (B) Reviving the EU market for high quality securitisation; (C) Greater harmonisation of accounting and auditing practices; (D) Addressing the most important bottlenecks preventing the integration of capital markets in areas like insolvency law, company law, property rights and the legal enforceability of cross-border claims.
 Reinforce the European Systemic Risk Board, so that it becomes capable of detecting risks to the financial sector as a whole.
 Launch a new advisory European Fiscal Board:

 Revamp the European Semester by reorganizing it to follow two consecutive stages. The first stage  shall be devoted to the eurozone as a whole, and the second stage  then subsequently feature a discussion of country specific issues. 
 Strengthen parliamentary control as part of the European Semester. This shall be achieved by:
 Plenary debate at the European Parliament first on the Annual Growth Survey and then on the Country-Specific Recommendations.
 More systematic interactions between Commissioners and national Parliaments on Country-Specific Recommendations and on national budgets.
 More systematic consultation by governments of national Parliaments and social partners before submitting National Reform and Stability Programmes.
 Increase the level of cooperation between the European Parliament and national Parliaments.
 Reinforce the steer of the Eurogroup:

 Take steps towards a consolidated external representation of the eurozone:

 Integrate intergovernmental agreements into the framework of EU law. This includes the Treaty on Stability, Coordination and Governance, the relevant parts of the Euro Plus Pact; and the Intergovernmental Agreement on the Single Resolution Fund.
 Stage 2: The achievements of the first stage would be consolidated. On basis of consultation with an expert group, the European Commission will publish a white paper in Spring 2017, which will conduct an assessment of progress made in Stage 1, and outline in more details the next steps and measures needed for completion of the EMU in Stage 2. This second stage is currently envisaged to comprise:
 The intergovernmental European Stability Mechanism should be moved into becoming part of the EU treaty law applying automatically for all eurozone member states (something which is possible to do within existing paragraphs of the current EU treaty), in order to simplify and institutionalize its governance.
 More far-reaching measures (i.e. commonly agreed "convergence benchmark standards" of a more binding legal nature, and a treasury for the eurozone), could also be agreed to complete the EMU's economic and institutional architecture, for the purpose of making the convergence process more binding.
 Significant progress towards these new common "convergence benchmark standards"  – and a continued adherence to them once they are reached – would need to be verified by regular monitoring and would be among the conditions for each eurozone Member State to meet in order to become eligible for participation in a new fiscal capacity referred to as the "economic shock absorption mechanism", which will be established for the eurozone as a last element of this second stage. The fundamental idea behind the "economic shock absorption mechanism", is that its conditional shock absorbing transfers shall be triggered long before there is a need for ESM to offer the country a conditional macroeconomic crisis support programme, but that the mechanism at the same time never shall result in permanent annual transfers - or income equalizing transfers - between countries. A first building block of this "economic shock absorption mechanism", could perhaps be establishment of a permanent version of the European Fund for Strategic Investments, in which the tap by a country into the identified pool of financing sources and future strategic investment projects could be timed to occur upon the periodic eruption of downturns/shocks in its economic business cycle. 
 Another important pre-condition for the launch of the "economic shock absorption mechanism", is expected to be, that the eurozone first establish an increasing degree of "common decision-making on national budgets" and an "enhanced coordination of economic policies" .
 Stage 3 (by 2025): Reaching the final stage of "a deep and genuine EMU", by also considering the prospects of potential EU treaty changes.

All of the above three stages are envisaged to bring further progress on all four dimensions of the EMU:
 Economic union: Focusing on convergence, prosperity, and social cohesion.
 Financial union: Completing the Banking union of the European Union and constructing a capital markets union.
 Fiscal union: Ensuring sound and integrated fiscal policies
 Political Union: Enhancing democratic accountability, legitimacy and institutional strengthening of the EMU.

Primary sources
The Historical Archives of the European Central Bank published the minutes, reports and transcripts of the Committee for the Study of Economic and Monetary Union ('Delors Committee') in March 2020.

See also 

 Capital Markets Union
 Banking union of the European Union
 Economy of the European Union
 European Central Bank
 European Supervisory Authorities
 Internal Market

Further reading

References

External links
EMU: A Historical Documentation (European Commission)
The euro (European Commission Economic and Financial Affairs)
European integration process: 1969–1979 Crises and revival: Economic and Monetary Union cooperation subject file by the CVCE (Centre of European Studies)
Completing Europe's Economic and Monetary Union: Five presidents' report (EC, EP, ECB, Eurogroup and Council)

Economy of the European Union
Monetary policy of the European Union